Volatile is the second studio album by The Lime Spiders, released in 1988 through Virgin Records on vinyl.

Track listing
 "Volatile" (Mick Blood, Gerard Corben) - 2:46
 "Can't Hear You Anymore" (Richard Lawson, Gerard Corben) - 2:37
 "The Odyssey" (Richard Lawson) - 3:16
 "Lot to Answer For" (Mick Blood) - 2:15
 "The Captor & the Captive One" (Tony Bambach) - 3:33
 "My Main Attraction" (Mick Blood) - 3:21
 "The Other Side of You" (Mick Blood) - 3:20
 "Deaf, Dumb and Blind" (Mick Blood) - 2:59
 "Strange Kind of Love" (Tony Bambach) - 3:00
 "Under My Umbrella" (Mick Blood) - 2:50
 "Won't Fall in Love" (Mick Blood) - 3:05
 "Test Pattern" (Mick Blood) - 4:35

Personnel

The Lime Spiders
 Mick Blood - lead vocals
 Tony Bambach - bass guitar, backing vocals
 Richard Lawson - drums, percussion, backing vocals
 Gerard Corben - guitars

Additional musicians 
Phil Graham, Nancy Kiel, Brigid O'Donohue - backing vocals on "Volatile"

References

1988 albums
Lime Spiders albums